Horse Hill is a residential area in the northeast portion of the City of Edmonton in Alberta, Canada. It was formally established on May 22, 2013 through Edmonton City Council's adoption of the Horse Hill Area Structure Plan, which guides the overall development of the area. The area is estimated to have a population of 71,467 at full build-out of five neighbourhoods.

The community is represented by the Horse Hill Community League, established in 1972.

Geography 
Located in northeast Edmonton, Horse Hill is bounded by Manning Drive (Highway 15) to the northwest, Anthony Henday Drive (Highway 216) to the southwest, the North Saskatchewan River valley to the south and east, and 33 Street NE to the northeast.

The Edmonton Energy and Technology Park, part of Alberta's Industrial Heartland, is located beyond Manning Drive to the northwest, while the Pilot Sound and Clareview areas are located beyond Anthony Henday Drive to the southeast. Edmonton's Clover Bar area is located across the North Saskatchewan River valley to the south, while Strathcona County and the City of Fort Saskatchewan is across the river valley to the east and northeast respectively. Sturgeon County is located beyond 33 Street NE to the northeast.

History 
Horse Hill got its name from its use as a guarded horse pasturage for horses belonging to nearby Fort Edmonton in the early 1800s. The name "Horse Hill" first appears in the Edmonton House Journal on December 28, 1825. The "horse guard" lived in tents on the site and tried to safeguard the fort's horses from being stolen by Natives.

By 1880s, it was more or less settled as farmland. It was within the Horse Hill School District and the County of Sturgeon prior to 1982 when it was annexed by the City of Edmonton.

In 1987, the Edmonton tornado whipped through the area, especially damaging to the Evergreen mobile home community within.

Neighbourhoods 
The Horse Hill area is planned to be developed into five neighbourhoods, with estimated full build-out populations ranging from 4,718 to 27,242. The Evergreen neighbourhood, a manufactured home community, and Quarry Ridge, an estate residential subdivision, are located within Horse Hill Neighbourhood 1. Neighbourhood 2 has been named Marquis.

Surrounding areas

See also 
 Edmonton Federation of Community Leagues

References 

Neighbourhoods in Edmonton